Huajialing Town is a township-level administrative unit under the jurisdiction of Tongwei County, Dingxi City, Gansu Province, People's Republic of China. It is located roughly equidistant from the seats of Tongwei, Huining and Anding (Dingxi city).

In 2017, the Civil Affairs Department of Gansu Province approved the abolition of Huajialing Township and the establishment of Huajialing Town.

The old Xi'an-Lanzhou highway passes through Huajialing, this road was first constructed in the 17th century and formed an important artery, especially during the Second Sino-Japanese War and the Chinese Civil War, when the area saw heavy fighting. During the 1980s the section through Huajialing lost its importance as a new route was built.

The town is at the center of a reforestation programme of Gansu's Loess Plateau region, which commenced in 1971.

Administrative divisions 

Huajialing Town governs the following areas:

Climate 

Huajialing has a subarctic climate (Köppen climate classification Dwc).

References 

Geography of the People's Republic of China